is a Japanese voice actress affiliated with 81 Produce. She is best known for her roles as Saaya Yakushiji / Cure Ange in Hugtto! PreCure. Later other roles in Wise Man's Grandchild, and Plunderer.

Biography
Honnizumi was born on 4 February 1993 in Fukushima Prefecture. She wanted to be a voice actor since she was in high school. Honnizumi graduated from Tokyo Animation College in March 2013.

In addition to voicing Cure Ange in Hugtto! PreCure, she also sang the ending themes "Hugtto! Future✩Dreamer" and "Hugtto! Yell For You" alongside the other main Cures. She also won the Best New Actress Award for the role of Cure Ange at the 13th Seiyu Awards alongside Manaka Iwami, Tomori Kusunoki, Coco Hayashi, and Kaede Hondo.

On 20 December 2018, she was cast as Sicily von Claude in the spring 2019 anime Wise Man's Grandchild alongside Yūsuke Kobayashi and Miyu Kubota. On 4 July 2019, she was cast as Hina in the manga-to-anime series Plunderer alongside Yoshiki Nakajima; it is set to premiere in 2020. On 20 September 2019, Honnizumi was cast as Shiragiku Ōmura in Tamayomi, another manga-to-anime series set to premiere in 2020, alongside Miyu Tomita, Yume Miyamoto, and fellow veteran Pretty Cure alumni Rina Kitagawa and Haruka Yoshimura.

In addition to anime, Honnizumi also voices Nadeshiko in the KLabs/MF Bunko J multimedia project Lapis Re:Lights.

Filmography
{| class="wikitable"
|-
!Year
!Title
!Role
!Notes
!Source
|-
| rowspan="3"| 2013
| Kill la Kill
| Customer
|
| 
|-
| Tamagotchi! || Customer 
| ||
|-
| Duel Masters Victory V3 || Teacher 
| ||
|-
| rowspan="3"| 2014
| Super Sonico the Animation
| Hyde-chan
|
| 
|-
| Tenkai Knights || Classmate 
| ||
|-
| Hanayamata || Student 
| ||
|-
| rowspan="2"| 2015
| Rin-ne
| Nekoda
|
| 
|-
| Wish Upon the Pleiades || Student A 
| ||
|-
| rowspan="3"| 2016
| Qualidea Code
| Announcer, Student
|
| 
|-
| Trickster || Pippo, Tomoe Tsuji 
| ||
|-
| Sailor Moon Crystal || Viluy 
| ||
|-
| rowspan="9"| 2017
| Yowamushi Pedal
| Schoolgirl
|
| 
|-
| BanG Dream! || Mayu Kawabata, Kaede Mizumura 
| ||
|-
| Tomica Hyper Rescue Drive Head Kidō Kyūkyū Keisatsu || Haruka
| ||
|-
| The Laughing Salesman || Female colleague 
| ||
|-
| Welcome to the Ballroom || Chinatsu's friend 
| ||
|-
| Omiai no Aite wa Oshiego, Tsuyoki na, Mondaiji || Nano Saikawa
|Normal version only||
|-
| UQ Holder! || Meg 
| ||
|-
| Future Card Buddyfight' || Child B 
| ||
|-
| Juni Taisen: Zodiac War || Student 
| ||
|-
| rowspan="11"| 2018
| Aikatsu Stars!| Girl
|
| 
|-
| Beatless || Clerk 
| ||
|-
| Hugtto! PreCure || Saaya Yakushiji/Cure Ange 
| ||
|-
| Inazuma Eleven: Ares || Surrounding girls 
| ||
|-
| Tada Never Falls in Love || Schoolgirl 
| ||
|-
| Wotakoi: Love Is Hard for Otaku || Minor characters 
| ||
|-
| Ongaku Shōjo || Shupe's mother 
| ||
|-
| 100 Sleeping Princes and the Kingdom of Dreams || Citizen B 
| ||
|-
| Merc Storia || Kesesera 
| ||
|-
| That Time I Got Reincarnated as a Slime || Pirino 
| ||
|-
| Zombie Land Saga || Migikawa 
| ||
|-
|rowspan="3"| 2019
| Wise Man's Grandchild| Sicily von Claude
|
| 
|-
| Endro!|Villager
|
|
|-
| Wasteful Days of High School Girls| Schoolgirl
|
|
|-
| rowspan="5"| 2020 || Plunderer || Hina 
| ||
|-
| MapleStory || Edea
| ||
|-
| Tamayomi || Shiragiku Ōmura
| ||
|-
| Lapis Re:Lights || Nadeshiko 
| ||
|-
| The Gymnastics Samurai || Rei Aragaki
| ||
|-
| rowspan="3" |2021
|Beyblade Burst Dynamite Battle|Hannah Suiryū
|
|
|-
| Let's Make a Mug Too || Toko Aoki
| ||
|-
| Remake Our Life! || Maki Hashiba
| ||
|-
| rowspan="2" |2022
| Kakegurui Twin || Tsuzura Hanatemari
| ||
|-
| Harem in the Labyrinth of Another World || Vesta
| ||
|-
| rowspan="1" |2023
| Isekai Shōkan wa Nidome Desu || Mineko
| ||
|-
|}

Cinema

Dubbing

Video gamesAtelier Lydie & Suelle: The Alchemists and the Mysterious Paintings DX - Nelke von LuchetamBanG Dream! - Mayu KawabataDestiny Child - SeleneGrimms Notes - KarenMapleStory - EdeaNelke & the Legendary Alchemists: Ateliers of the New World - Nelke von LuchetamProject Sekai: Colorful Stage feat. Hatsune Miku - Shizuku HinomoriFigure Fantasy'' - Evita

References

External links
  
 

Living people
Voice actresses from Fukushima Prefecture
Japanese video game actresses
Japanese voice actresses
Seiyu Award winners
81 Produce voice actors
21st-century Japanese women singers
21st-century Japanese singers
Year of birth missing (living people)